Lasiopetalum adenotrichum is a species of flowering plant in the family Malvaceae and is endemic to the Fitzgerald River National Park in the south of Western Australia. It is an erect shrub with hairy foliage, narrow egg-shaped to lance-shaped leaves and groups of white to cream-coloured and dark reddish-purple flowers.

Description
The upper surface of the leaves has scattered, rust-coloured, star-shaped hairs and the lower surface is densely covered with mostly white star-shaped hairs.

Taxonomy
Lasiopetalum adenotrichum was first formally described in 2014 by Rachel A. Meissner and Damien A. Rathbone in the journal Nuytsia from specimens collected by Rathbone in the Fitzgerald River National Park in 2012. The specific epithet (adenotrichum) means "gland-hair", referring to the hairs on the foliage.

Distribution and habitat
This lasiopetalum is only known from scattered populations in the Fitzgerald River National Park where it grows in low heath.

Conservation status
Lasiopetalum adenotrichum is listed as "Priority Two" by the Western Australian Government Department of Biodiversity, Conservation and Attractions, meaning that it is poorly known and from only one or a few locations.

References

adenotrichum
Malvales of Australia
Flora of Western Australia
Plants described in 2014